Buccaneer's Girl is a 1950 American Technicolor romantic adventure film directed by Frederick de Cordova starring Yvonne De Carlo and Philip Friend.

Plot
Deborah McCoy, a New Orleans singer, is on a ship that is captured by the forces of the pirate captain Fredric Baptiste. Baptiste keeps McCoy captive but she escapes in New Orleans and is hired as a singer by Mme. Brizar, the proprietor of a school for young ladies.

Deborah is sent to a party held by Captain Robert Kingston, the head of the Seaman's Fund. Robert is also Baptiste. She discovers that Baptiste uses his piracy activities to subsidise the Fund, which supports local seamen. Robert is engaged to Arlene Villon.

The businessman Narbonne discovers Baptiste's ruse and sets a trap for him. Deborah overhears this and joins Baptiste on the open seas. They attack Narbonne's ships.

Baptiste is captured by Narbonne but Deborah helps him escape.

Cast
 Yvonne De Carlo as Deborah McCoy
 Philip Friend as Frederic Baptiste
 Robert Douglas as Narbonne
 Elsa Lanchester as Mme. Brizar
 Andrea King as Arlene Villon
 Norman Lloyd as Patout
 Jay C. Flippen as Jared Hawkins
 Henry Daniell as Captain Duval
 Douglass Dumbrille as Captain Martos
 Verna Felton as Dowager
 John Qualen as Vegetable Man
 Connie Gilchrist as Vegetable Woman
 Ben Welden as Tom
 Dewey Robinson as Kryl
 Peggie Castle as Cleo

Production
	
The film was originally known as Mademoiselle McCoy and the Pirates. In May 1949 Joseph Hoffman was hired to work on the script.

It appears to have always been considered a vehicle for Yvonne De Carlo. Paul Christian was originally announced as her co-star. Christian ended up being replaced by Philip Friend, who was cast on the basis of his performance in another Universal film, Sword in the Desert (1949).

Robert Douglas was cast as the lead villain in the film, the first of a three-picture contract he made with Universal.

Filming began July 1949.

The supporting cast included Ethel Ince, widow of John Ince, playing her first role in thirty years.

When asked about the film, De Carlo said, "What a dilly! I had six knock down, drag out fights in that one. And I was just recuperating from an operation."

Reception
Yvonne De Carlo later wrote in her memoirs that while touring Argentina, Eva Perón called her to say how much she enjoyed De Carlo's movies, particularly Buccaneer's Girl. De Carlo wrote, "It later dawned on me that she could identify with the character of Deborah McCoy, who capitalized on her position as a prostitute to move up into high society."

References

External links

Buccaneer's Girl at TCMDB

1950s English-language films
Films directed by Frederick de Cordova
1950 films
1950s historical adventure films
American historical adventure films
Films scored by Walter Scharf
Films set in New Orleans
Films set in the 1800s
Pirate films
Universal Pictures films
1950s American films